Iron Mountain, in southern Iron County, Utah, United States, is the namesake of Iron County. Its summit is at

Description
The mountain has a long history of iron mining, in the form of magnetite and hematite. Mining at this site goes back to Brigham Young and Mormon pioneers in the 1850s. The early history of this mining can be seen at Iron Mission State Park in nearby Cedar City, Utah. It is one of three major peaks in the Iron Mountain Mining District.

See also

 List of Mountains in Utah

References

External links

Mountains of Iron County, Utah
Iron mines in the United States
Mountains of Utah